Aiwan-i Begumpet, also known as Chiraan Fort Palace (Chiran Fort Club), and Devdi Fareed Nawaz Jung, or Devdi Nazir Nawaz Jung, was built in 1880 by Sir Viqar-ul-Umra, Amir of the Great Paigah Dynasty of Deccan who served as Prime Minister of Hyderabad. The palace was built after the construction of Falaknuma Palace gifted to the sixth Nizam of Hyderabad Mir Mahbub Ali Khan, Asaf Jah VI. Devdi is one of the complex in the Paigah Palace residence house of the Paigah Nobelity, In the hierarchy of nobles of Hyderabad, the Paigah family ranked immediately next to the ruling family of Nizams.

Palace History 
In the hierarchy of nobles of Hyderabad, the Paigah family ranked immediately next to the ruling family of Nizams.

The Paigahs were also the foremost palace builders of Hyderabad. As described earlier, the Falaknuma Palace was built by Nawab Viqar ul-Umra This was later acquired by the Nizam VI.
Near the chiraan fort palace lies the Deoris of Paigah Palace Nawab Muzaffar Nawaz Jung, Nawab Nazir Nawaz Jung, Nawab Khair Nawaz Jung and Nawab Hassan Yar Jung who were grandsons of Sir Viqar-ul-Umra, Chiraan fort was used as a residence for Sir Fareed Nawaz Jung and his family the palace was passed down through 3 generations as residence until Sahebzade Hyder Nawab Grandson of Fareed nawaz Jung converted the palace into a club.

References 

Heritage structures in Hyderabad, India
Palaces in Hyderabad, India
Hyderabad State
Royal residences in India
Heritage hotels in India
Tourist attractions in Hyderabad, India
Houses completed in 1889
Hotels in Hyderabad
Palaces of Paigah of Hyderabad
Neoclassical architecture in India